The 1979 Stinkers Bad Movie Awards were released by the Hastings Bad Cinema Society in 1980 to honour the worst films the film industry had to offer in 1979. The ballot was later revisited and the expanded version was released in late 2004. Listed as follows are the original ballot's picks for Worst Picture and its dishonourable mentions, which are films that were considered for Worst Picture but ultimately failed to make the final ballot (17 total), and all nominees included in the expanded ballot. All winners are highlighted.

Original Ballot

Worst Picture

Dishonourable Mentions 

 1941 (Universal)
 Americathon (United Artists)
 The Amityville Horror (American International)
 The Black Hole (Disney)
 Bloodline (Paramount)
 The Champ (United Artists)
 The Electric Horseman (Columbia/Universal)
 Hurricane (Paramount)
 The Jerk (Universal)
 Just You and Me, Kid (Columbia)
 Love at First Bite (American International)
 The Main Event (Warner Bros.)
 Meteor (American International)
 More American Graffiti (Universal)
 Roller Boogie (United Artists)
 Sammy Stops the World (Special Event)
 The Warriors (Paramount)

Expanded Ballot

Worst Picture

Dishonourable Mentions 

 The Amityville Horror (American International)
 The Bell Jar (AVCO Embassy)
 Beyond the Poseidon Adventure (Warner Bros.)
 The Black Hole (Disney)
 Bloodline (Paramount)
 Butch and Sundance: The Early Days (Fox)
 City on Fire (Astral Films)
 The Frisco Kid (Warner Bros.)
 Hardcore (Columbia)
 Love and Bullets (Associated Film Distributors)
 More American Graffiti (Universal)
 Nightwing (Columbia)
 Penitentiary (The Jerry Gross Organization)
 Roller Boogie (United Artists)
 Scavenger Hunt (Fox)
 The Villain (Columbia)

Worst Director

Dishonourable Mentions 

 Robert Aldrich for The Frisco Kid
 Irwin Allen for Beyond the Poseidon Adventure
 Robert Altman for Quintet
 Dom DeLuise for Hot Stuff
 Stan Dragoti for Love at First Bite
 Arthur Hiller for Nightwing
 Neal Israel for Americathon
 Richard Lester for Butch and Sundance: The Early Days
 Hal Needham for The Villain
 Gary Nelson for The Black Hole
 B.W.L. Norton for More American Graffiti
 Stuart Rosenberg for The Amityville Horror and Love and Bullets
 Paul Schrader for Hardcore
 Michael Schultz for Scavenger Hunt
 Steven Spielberg for 1941
 Sylvester Stallone for Rocky II
 Robert Wise for Star Trek: the Motion Picture

Worst Actor

Dishonourable Mentions 

 Dan Aykroyd in 1941
 Jim Bray in Roller Boogie
 Charles Bronson in Love and Bullets
 Dom DeLuise in Hot Stuff
 Harrison Ford in The Frisco Kid and Hanover Street
 Gil Gerard in Buck Rogers in the 25th Century
 Charles Grodin in Sunburn
 Ken Kerr in Beneath the Valley of the Ultra-Vixens
 Steve Martin in The Jerk
 Charles Martin Smith in More American Graffiti
 Sylvester Stallone in Rocky II
 Jon Voight in The Champ
 Gene Wilder in The Frisco Kid

Worst Actress

Dishonourable Mentions 

 Joan Collins in The Bitch
 Faye Dunaway in The Champ
 Farrah Fawcett-Majors in Sunburn
 Susan St. James in Love at First Bite
 Lynn-Holly Johnson in Ice Castles

Worst Supporting Actor

Dishonourable Mentions 

 James Coco in Scavenger Hunt
 Matt Craven in Meatballs
 Eddie Deezen in 1941
 Alix Elias in Rock 'n' Roll High School
 Gert Frobe in Bloodline
 Walter Koenig in Star Trek: the Motion Picture
 Strother Martin in Nightwing
 Jeff Nicholson in The Double McGuffin
 Avery Schreiber in Scavenger Hunt
 Rod Steiger in The Amityville Horror and Love and Bullets
 Erland Van Lidth De Jeude in The Wanderers
 Jonathan Winters in The Fish That Saved Pittsburgh
 Burt Young in Rocky II

Worst Supporting Actress

Dishonourable Mentions 

 Ruth Buzzi in The Apple Dumpling Gang Rides Again
 Joan Collins in Sunburn
 Bo Derek in 10
 Lesley-Ann Down in The First Great Train Robbery and Hanover Street
 Patti D'Arbanville in The Main Event
 Sally Field in Beyond the Poseidon Adventure
 Ava Gardner in City on Fire
 Ruth Gordon in Scavenger Hunt
 Persis Khambatta in Star Trek: the Motion Picture
 Cloris Leachman in Scavenger Hunt
 Linda Manz in The Wanderers
 Kitten Natividad in Beneath the Valley of the Ultra-Vixens
 Bernadette Peters in The Jerk
 Ann Reinking in All That Jazz

Worst Screenplay

Dishonourable Mentions 

 The Amityville Horror (American International)
 The Bell Jar (AVCO Embassy)
 The Bitch (Thorn EMI)
 The Black Hole (Disney)
 Bloodline (Paramount)
 Buck Rogers in the 25th Century (Universal)
 The Frisco Kid (Warner Bros.)
 Hardcore (Columbia)
 Love and Bullets (Associated Film Distributors)
 More American Graffiti (Universal)
 Nightwing (Columbia)
 Rocky II (United Artists)
 Scavenger Hunt (Fox)

Worst Sequel

Dishonourable Mentions 

 Beneath the Valley of the Ultra-Vixens (Signal 166)
 The Bitch (Thorn EMI)
 Moonraker (United Artists)
 Zulu Dawn (American Cinema)

Most Painfully Unfunny Comedy

Dishonourable Mentions 

 Americathon (United Artists)
 Beneath the Valley of the Ultra-Vixens (Signal 166)
 Buck Rogers in the 25th Century (Universal)
 Hot Stuff (Columbia)
 More American Graffiti (Universal)
 Scavenger Hunt (Fox)
 Spaced Out (Miramax)
 The Villain (Columbia)

Worst Song or Song Performance in a Film or Its End Credits

Dishonourable Mentions 

 "Close Enough For Love" by Patti Brooks from Agatha
 "Don't Call It Love" by Henry Mancini from 10
 "Hell on Wheels" by Cher from Roller Boogie
 "Help Yourself To Me" by Pam Miller & Danny Bonaduce from H.O.T.S.
 "I'll Never Say Goodbye" by Melissa Manchester from The Promise
 "It Goes Like It Goes" by Jennifer Warnes from Norma Rae
 "The Main Event/Fight" by Barbra Streisand from The Main Event
 "Meatballs" by Rick Dees from Meatballs
 "Mighty, Mighty Pisces" by The Sylvers from The Fish That Saved Pittsburgh
 "Moonraker" by Shirley Bassey from Moonraker
 "Sittin' Here at Midnight" by Bill Thornbury from Phantasm
 "Somebody Who Really Cares" by Dion Pride from The Double McGuffin
 "Suspension (Far Beyond)" by Kipp Lennon from Buck Rogers in the 25th Century
 "There's Enough For Everyone" by Scatman Crothers from Scavenger Hunt
 "'Til the End" by Peter Matz from The Prize Fighter
 "The Villain" by Mel Tillis from The Villain
 "Wanda's Wish" by Asleep at the Wheel from Wanda Nevada

Most Intrusive Musical Score

Dishonourable Mentions 

 The Black Hole (Disney)
 The Champ (United Artists)
 Disco Godfather (Transvue Pictures)
 The Driller Killer (Rochelle Films)
 Electric Horseman (Columbia/Universal)
 Hardcore (Columbia)
 Ice Castles (Columbia)
 Moonraker (United Artists)
 Zulu Dawn (American Cinema)

 'Note: no nominees and winners were given for this category—just dishonourable mentions.

 Worst On-Screen Couple 

 Dishonourable Mentions 

 Robby Benson & Lynn-Holly Johnson in Ice Castles Linda Blair & Jim Bray in Roller Boogie Keith Carradine & Monica Vitti in An Almost Perfect Affair Jackie Collins & any male in The Bitch Tim Conway & Don Knotts in The Apple Dumpling Gang Rides Again Bobby DiCicco & Perry Lang in 1941 Harrison Ford & Lesley-Anne Down in Hanover Street Charles Grodin & Farrah Fawcett-Majors in Sunburn William Katt & Tom Berenger in Butch and Sundance: The Early Days Richard Kiel & Blanche Ravalec in Moonraker Roger Perry & Beverly Garland in Roller Boogie Robert Redford & Jane Fonda in The Electric Horseman Jon Voight & Faye Dunaway in The Champ Persis Khambatta & Stephen Collins in Star Trek: the Motion Picture Erland Van Lidth De Jeude & Linda Manz in The Wanderers Least "Special" Special Effects 

 Worst Fake Accent (Male) 

 Worst Fake Accent (Female) 

 Worst On-Screen Group 

 Most Annoying Non-Human Character 

 Dishonourable Mentions 

 Dickey the Monkey in The Attic The Killer Bats in Nightwing The Killer Bear Monster in Prophecy Marjeeb's Pet Monkey in Arabian Adventure Maximilian in The Black Hole The Vger Probe (Persis Khambatta) in Star Trek: The Motion Picture''

References 

Stinkers Bad Movie Awards